Vadis is an unincorporated community in Lewis County, West Virginia, United States.

Some say the community was named after the novel Quo Vadis by Henryk Sienkiewicz, while others believe the name an anagram of Davis, the name of an early postmaster.

See also
 List of geographic names derived from anagrams and ananyms

References

Unincorporated communities in Lewis County, West Virginia
Unincorporated communities in West Virginia